Erdős or Erdos is a Hungarian surname.

Erdos or Erdős may also refer to:
 Erdos Group, a Chinese conglomerate
 Lesnica (Slovakia), a village and municipality in Slovakia
 Ordos City, a city in Inner Mongolia, China

See also 
 List of things named after Paul Erdős